Derek Hahn (born December 27, 1977) is a Canadian former professional ice hockey forward.

Playing career
After playing collegiate hockey with the R.I.T. Tigers, Hahn made his professional debut with the Elmira Jackals in the United Hockey League. After five seasons in the Central Hockey League as a cult player with the Amarillo Gorillas, Hahn embarked on a European career, signing initially in the AL-Bank Ligaen with the Rødovre Mighty Bulls.

Hahn established himself in the Deutsche Eishockey Liga as an offensive force, playing eight seasons with the Frankfurt Lions, Straubing Tigers and ERC Ingolstadt. In 2014, he helped Ingolstadt capture the German championship, tallying 46 points (12 goals, 34 assists) in 52 games throughout the season. On June 9, 2015, Hahn left Germany, to sign in the neighbouring Austrian League, with HC TWK Innsbruck of the EBEL on a one-year deal.

Awards and honours

References

External links

1977 births
Amarillo Gorillas players
Atlantic City Boardwalk Bullies players
Canadian ice hockey centres
Elmira Jackals (UHL) players
ERC Ingolstadt players
Frankfurt Lions players
HC TWK Innsbruck players
Ice hockey people from Ontario
Living people
RIT Tigers men's ice hockey players
Rødovre Mighty Bulls players
Straubing Tigers players
People from Woolwich, Ontario
Canadian expatriate ice hockey players in Austria
Canadian expatriate ice hockey players in Germany
Canadian expatriate ice hockey players in the United States